Illinois Route 116 (IL 116) is a  cross-state rural state highway that runs from U.S. Route 34 (US 34) by Gladstone east to the intersection of US 45 (North Front Street) and Old US 45, on the north side of Ashkum.

Route description 

It crosses the Illinois River from Peoria to East Peoria with Illinois Route 8 on the Cedar Street Bridge.

On the southeast side of the Illinois River, Route 116, U.S. Route 24 and U.S. Route 150 form a wrong-way concurrency. Travelling northeast along the river, U.S. 150 is marked west before crossing the river to enter Peoria, Illinois 116 is marked east, and U.S. 24 is also marked east before branching to north of Washington. Travelling southwest, U.S. 150 is marked east before branching to Morton, Illinois 116 is marked west before crossing the river to enter Peoria on its southern side, and U.S. 24 is also marked west before continuing south with Illinois Route 29.

History

U.S. Route 124 

U.S. Route 124 (US 124) was a U.S. Highway that was commissioned from 1926 to 1938, and was located in Illinois, traveling from Peoria through Biggsville. SBI Route 116 originally traveled separately from east of Ashkum to East Peoria.

US 124 was an original 1928 US route in Illinois, since before then US routes didn't appear on Illinois maps. Its original route was from Peoria to Galesburg, along by the then IL 8, via Farmington and Maquon now on the route of  IL 116, west from Peoria to IL 97, north to IL 8, west to IL 97, then northwest on IL 97 to Galesburg, then continues its last few miles on the current US 150.

In 1934, US 124 was rerouted west on the current IL 116 to near Biggsville, where it connected to US 34, for access to the Mississippi River crossing into Iowa. Westbound traffic from Peoria had a choice. Proceed along US 24 to cross the Mississippi River at Quincy (south-west route) – the old Peoria to Quincy stagecoach route, or take US 124 to cross the Mississippi River (US 34) at Burlington, Iowa (north-west route).

Illinois Route 116 
After the entirety of US 124 changed to Illinois 116 as an extension of that route in east-central Illinois. Illinois 116 was a popular agricultural and commercial truck route from Burlington, Iowa (on the Mississippi River) to Peoria, Illinois (on the Illinois River) during World War II and through the late 1960s. This was due to the: Iowa Army Ammunition Plant near Burlington; active strip mining of coal in Fulton County (largely south of the route); farm livestock traffic to the Peoria stockyards; and grain transport (corn and soybeans) to the Illinois and Mississippi barge terminals.

With the completion of Interstate 474 as a western bypass of Peoria in 1978, an Interstate connector (exit 3 on Interstate 474) was constructed as the eastern terminus for the proposed western Illinois expressway (Peoria to Kansas City via Macomb and Quincy). The connector provides access to IL 116.

Related routes

Illinois Route 97A 

Illinois Route 97A was a short rural spur (state-maintained) that ran from IL 97 (later U.S. Route 124; now IL 116) south of Media to the community of Raritan.

IL 97A was established in 1929 as well as IL 97. It lasted until 1937 when IL 97A was decommissioned. This is because US 124 had superseded what used to be IL 97 entirely in 1935. Today, the route is signed as CR 8.

Illinois Route 116A 

Illinois Route 116A was a  spur of IL 116 that followed what is now part of IL 117.

Initially, IL 116A used to directly connect to Benson. In 1932, the route moved slightly west. It remained like this until 1993 when IL 117 extended north to IL 17 north of Toluca, removing IL 116A in the process.

Major intersections

See also 
Illinois Route 336

References

External links

116
Transportation in Fulton County, Illinois
Transportation in Peoria County, Illinois
Transportation in Henderson County, Illinois
Transportation in Warren County, Illinois
Transportation in Knox County, Illinois
Transportation in Tazewell County, Illinois
Transportation in Woodford County, Illinois
Transportation in Livingston County, Illinois
Transportation in Ford County, Illinois
Transportation in Iroquois County, Illinois